Mirror turtle ants (Cephalotes specularis) are a species of ant that mimic other, unrelated ants (Crematogaster ampla) in order to steal their food.

Discovery
Assistant professor of biology Scott Powell at George Washington University discovered them while studying turtle ants in Brazil. Powell has said that the mirror turtle ant represents a glimpse of the early stages of social parasitism, before the parasite has "lost much of its free-living biology".

References

Cephalotes
Insects described in 2014
Fauna of Brazil
Hymenoptera of South America